Kälarne IK is a sports club in Kälarne, Sweden, established on 14 February 1920.

The women's soccer team played in the Swedish top division in 1978.

Other famous people are track and field athletes Henry Kälarne and Gunder Hägg and cross-country skier Alfred Dahlqvist, who at different occasions have competed for the club.

References

External links
Official website 

Football clubs in Jämtland County
Rowing clubs
Sports clubs established in 1920
Athletics clubs in Sweden
1920 establishments in Sweden
Sport in Jämtland County
Ski clubs in Sweden